Herbert of Bosham was a twelfth-century English biographer of Thomas Becket who held a foremost place among the scholars in Thomas's household. His dates of birth and death are unknown, but he was active from 1162 until 1189.

Early life
He was probably born in Bosham, Sussex, from which he took his name.

He studied theology in Paris as a pupil of Peter Lombard. He introduced Lombard's Sentences into England.

Companion to Becket
He must have joined Becket's household before 1162 as, on his elevation in that year, the new archbishop immediately promoted him to a responsible position. He was to give his master advice on the performance of his duties, and to assist and even direct his studies of Scripture.

Herbert remained closely attached to Becket throughout the arduous and troubled years of his episcopacy and exile until almost the very eve of the final scene in Canterbury Cathedral. Having returned to England with Becket in December 1170, he remained with him until sent back again on an errand to the French king; vainly he implored his master to let him stay for the end which both felt to be close at hand, and which in fact came two days after his departure. Of all the archbishop's followers he was the keenest antagonist of the king Henry II of England and the royal "customs", quite ready on occasion to beard the king to his face or to undertake dangerous missions to England.

Biographer
After Becket's death Herbert seems to have lived mainly on the Continent, not revisiting England until about 1184, and he complains that he was neglected; he records, however, a friendly interview with the king himself. We know nothing of him after the year 1189.

Herbert of Bosham's verbose biography of Becket has less historical value of than that of William Fitzstephen. He shared Thomas's ideals and was an eyewitness of most of the incidents of his episcopacy. He had sat by him, for instance, during the stormy scenes of the trial at Northampton. On the other hand, he did not begin to write till 1184, many years after the events which he records, and Dom Albert L'Huillier gave reasons to doubt the accuracy of Herbert's reminiscences.

Besides the Life of St. Thomas, he wrote a lengthy Liber Melorum in praise of him. An edition of the Life is contained in vol. III of the Materials for the History of Thomas Becket (Rolls Series) edited by James Craigie Robertson; the volume also contains some extracts from the Liber Melorum.

Fictional portrayals
Herbert was portrayed by actor Clive Currie in the 1924 silent film Becket, based on a play of the same title by Alfred Lord Tennyson.

Notes

References
Introduction to vol. III of the Materials

L'Huillier, St. Thomas de Canterbury, I (Paris, 1891), note A.

People from Bosham
English biographers
12th-century English people
12th-century English writers
12th-century births
Year of birth unknown
Year of death unknown
British Hebraists
12th-century Latin writers